Abbe (or Abbie) Carter Goodloe (January 15, 1867 – October 8, 1960) was an American writer, sometimes credited as A. Carter Goodloe or Carter Goodloe.

Early life 
Abbie Carter was born in Versailles, Kentucky, the daughter of John Kemp Goodloe and Mary Lucretia Goodloe. Her mother was a clubwoman, and her father was a lawyer and a judge. She graduated from Wellesley College in 1898, and wrote the lyrics for two songs in the college songbook ("Mona Lisa" and "Le Pays du Tendre"). After college she went to France to improve her French language skills.

Career 
Goodloe was a writer who specialized in short stories, many of which were published in Scribner's Magazine.  She also did translations for Scribner's. Books by Goodloe included Antinoüs: a tragedy (1891), College Girls (1895, a collection of her stories, illustrated by Charles Dana Gibson), Calvert of Strathore (1903, a novel), At the Foot of the Rockies (1905, more short stories), and The Star-Gazers (1910, a romance set in Mexico). Her style was described as "vivid", and "essentially clever and racy to a delightful degree", in an 1895 review. She also wrote plays. Her story "Claustrophobia" (Scribner's, 1926) won an O. Henry Award in 1927; it was made into a film titled I Live My Life (1935), starring Joan Crawford and Brian Aherne. Later in her career, she sold scenarios for television productions.

During World War I, she hosted fundraising events for war relief causes with the Wellesley Club of Kentucky.

Personal life 
Goodloe played golf. She died in 1960, aged 93 years, in New York City. Her stories are still anthologized in collections of American literature.

References

External links 

 

1867 births
1960 deaths
People from Versailles, Kentucky
20th-century American women writers
Wellesley College alumni
American women in World War I
20th-century American short story writers
Writers from Kentucky
American women short story writers
19th-century American women writers
19th-century American short story writers